Elsa Irma Aguirre Juárez (born 25 September 1930) is a Mexican actress.

Career

At the beginning of her career she was discovered when she was teenager, in a beauty contest held by a cinematographic production company called CLASA Films Mundiales, which was looking for new talent. Thus, she and her sister Alma Rosa were chosen to appear in their first film   called El sexo fuerte in 1945, directed by Emilio Gómez Muriel. Since then, Elsa Aguirre has starred in many types of films such as drama, romance, action, fiction, etc. throughout her career. Elsa Aguirre appeared with her sister Alma Rosa in some of her films.

One of her films is Algo flota sobre el agua (1947) directed by Alfredo B. Crevenna, in which she starred with Arturo de Córdova. Elsa inspired a song called Flor de azalea, composed by Zacarías Gómez Urquiza and Manuel Esperón exclusively for her. This song was the soundtrack of this film. Aguirre has appeared in theatre, television series and singing in live shows.

Other films in which she appeared are, among others:
 Cuidado con el amor (1954) directed by Miguel Zacarías, and co-starring Pedro Infante and Eulalio González “Piporro”.
 Vainilla, bronce y morir (Una mujer más) (1956) directed by Rogelio A. González, co-starring Ignacio López Tarso.
 Pancho Villa y la Valentina (1958) directed by Ismael Rodríguez and co-starring Pedro Armendáriz.
 Ama a tu prójimo (1958) directed by Tulio Demicheli, also starring her sister Alma Rosa and Mario Moreno “Cantinflas”.

Filmography

Bibliography

References

External links

 
 Elsa Aguirre, alma-latina.net   
 Biography, pictures and filmography 
 Estrellas del Cine Mexicano: Elsa Aguirre, cinemexicano.mty.itesm.mx 

20th-century Mexican actresses
Mexican film actresses
Mexican television actresses
Mexican telenovela actresses
Actresses from Chihuahua (state)
Golden Age of Mexican cinema
Golden Ariel Award winners
Mexican people of Basque descent
People from Chihuahua City
Living people
Year of birth uncertain
1930 births